Yuri Chesnichenko (also romanized French-style as Iouri Tchesnitchenko) is a former ice dancer who competed with Yaroslava Nechaeva for the Soviet Union, Russia, and Latvia. He currently lives in Ann Arbor, Michigan where he works as a coach.

Career 
Chesnichenko was partnered with Yaroslava Nechaeva when they were fourteen. They won the silver medal at the 1992 World Junior Championships for the Soviet Union. The following season, they won silver at the 1992 Skate Canada International competing for Russia. In their final season, they switched to Latvia and placed 13th at the 1994 European Championships.

After retiring from competition, Nechaeva/Chesnichenko performed on tour with Torvill/Dean's Ice Adventures. In 1999, they began coaching at the Ann Arbor Figure Skating Club in Ann Arbor, Michigan.

Among Nechaeva and Chesnichenko's current and former students are Emily Samuelson / Todd Gilles, Emily Samuelson / Evan Bates, Madison Hubbell / Keiffer Hubbell, and Lynn Kriengkrairut / Logan Giulietti-Schmitt. At the 2007 U.S. Championships, their teams swept the junior ice dancing podium.

Competitive highlights 
With Nechaeva

References 

Russian figure skating coaches
American figure skating coaches
Figure skating choreographers
Russian male ice dancers
Soviet male ice dancers
Latvian male ice dancers
Living people
World Junior Figure Skating Championships medalists
Year of birth missing (living people)